Charles-Joseph Pasquier (9 November 1882 – 23 November 1953), known by his stage name of Bach, was a French actor, singer and music hall performer.

Selected filmography
 The Regiment's Champion (1932)
 The Blaireau Case (1932)
 Bach the Millionaire (1933)
 Bach the Detective (1936)
 Gargousse (1938)
 The Porter from Maxim's (1939)
 The Martyr of Bougival (1949)

References

Bibliography 
 Crisp, Colin. French Cinema—A Critical Filmography: Volume 1, 1929–1939. Indiana University Press, 2015.

External links 
 

1882 births
1953 deaths
French male film actors
20th-century French  male singers